Kyle O'Gara (born February 23, 1995 in Beech Grove, Indiana) is an American racing driver.

Career
O'Gara competed in the USAC National Midget Series in 2011 and 2012. He finished fourth at the USAC Pavement Midget Series in 2013, and he claimed the title in 2014.

On October 18, 2012 he completed his Indy Lights rookie test at Kentucky Speedway with Fan Force United. On March 27, 2013 he announced that he had signed with Schmidt Peterson Motorsports to make his Indy Lights debut in the 2013 Freedom 100 at Indianapolis Motor Speedway. O'Gara crashed out on lap two while running fifth. He also competed in the season finale at Auto Club Speedway and finished eighth.

In 2017 he was runner-up at the Rumble in Fort Wayne midget race.

In 2020 he finished fourth at the Little 500 sprint car race at Anderson Speedway.

In 2021 he entered four rounds of the USAC Silver Crown Series, with a best result of fifth at the Rich Vogler Classic at Winchester Speedway.

In 2022 he ranked third at the Indiana-based 500 Sprint Car Tour, scoring a win and five top 3 finishes in nine races. He also won the Dave Steele World Non-Wing Sprint Car Championship at Showtime Speedway, and finished fourth at the Little 500.

Personal life
Kyle O'Gara is the brother-in-law of Sarah Fisher, an ex-IndyCar Series driver and former co-owner of Sarah Fisher Hartman Racing. He attended Roncalli High School in Indianapolis.

Indy Lights

U.S. F2000 National Championship

References

External links

Kyle O'Gara race results at The Third Turn

1995 births
Racing drivers from Indianapolis
Indy Lights drivers
Living people
People from Beech Grove, Indiana
U.S. F2000 National Championship drivers
USAC Silver Crown Series drivers